Colin Cooper (born 1967) is an English footballer.

Colin Cooper may also refer to:
 Colin Campbell Cooper (1856–1937), American Impressionist painter
 Colin Cooper (rugby union) (born 1959), New Zealand rugby union coach
 Colin Cooper (cancer researcher), professor of cancer genetics at the University of East Anglia
 Colin Cooper (psychologist), British psychologist
 Colin Cooper, British musician, founding member of the Climax Blues Band